The Athletics at the 2016 Summer Paralympics – Men's 1500 metres T52 event at the 2016 Paralympic Games took place on 15 September 2016, at the Estádio Olímpico João Havelange.

Final 
10:24 15 September 2016:

Notes

Athletics at the 2016 Summer Paralympics
2016 in men's athletics